Structural chemistry is a part of chemistry and deals with spatial structures of molecules (in the gaseous, liquid or solid state) and solids (with extended structures that cannot be subdivided into molecules).

The main tasks are:
 The formulation of general laws for structure-property relationships; and
 The derivation of general rules on how the chemical and physical properties of the constituents of matter determine the resulting structures (e.g. the relationship between the electron configuration of the crystal building blocks and the symmetry of the resulting crystal lattice).

For structure elucidation a range of different methods are used. One has to distinguish between methods that elucidate solely the connectivity between atoms (constitution) and such that provide precise three dimensional information such as atom coordinates, bond lengths and angles and torsional angles. The latter methods include (mainly):

for the gaseous state: gas electron diffraction and microwave spectroscopy
for the liquid state: NMR spectroscopy (note, obtaining precise structural information from liquids and solutions is still rather difficult compared to gases and crystalline solids)
for the solid state: X-ray, electron and neutron diffraction

To identify connectivity and the presence of functional groups a variety of methods of molecular spectroscopy and solid state spectroscopy can be used.

See also
 Chemical structure

References

Chemistry